The Swing (French: La balançoire) is an 1876 oil on canvas painting by the French artist Pierre-Auguste Renoir who was a leading exponent of the Impressionist style. The painting measures 92 x 73 centimetres and is in the Musée d’Orsay. Renoir executed the painting in what are now the Musée de Montmartre gardens. He had rented a cottage in the gardens so that he could be closer to the Moulin de la Galette where he was engaged in painting Bal du moulin de la Galette.

Description 
Renoir's people seem to stand on a forest floor of blossoms. The girl on the swing could be fifteen, her pink dress with a hat on head increases the charm of painting. The quivering light is rendered by the patches of pale colour, particularly on the clothing and the ground. This particularly annoyed the critics when the painting was shown at the Salon of 1877.

The model was Jeanne Samary, a favourite of Renoir's who appears in many of his paintings. The two men are Renoir's brother Edmond and a painter friend Norbert Goeneutte (also appearing in Bal).

See also 
 The Swing, a painting by Jean-Honoré Fragonard (c. 1767)

References 

1876 paintings
Paintings by Pierre-Auguste Renoir
Paintings in the collection of the Musée d'Orsay
Paintings of Montmartre
Paintings of children